Mustafa Mijajlović (Cyrillic: Мустафа Мијајловић; born 17 March 1972 as Marjan Mijajlović) is a Bosnian sports commentator.

Career
Mijajlović's career began in the Serbian sports television station Sport Klub. He became popular in Serbia and in Bosnia and Herzegovina for his positive comments on Bosnian players in the Bundesliga.

After the 2007/2008 Bundesliga season was over, Mijajlović took a job with Bosnian NTV Hayat to commentate Bosnia and Herzegovina national football team matches. He commentated only one game (Belgium - Bosnia), which Bosnia won 4–2. Mijajlović gained notability for his call of the first Bosnian goal in which he referred to the player Edin Džeko as a diamond and gave the team the nickname of the "Dragons". However, several weeks after the legendary game, Mijajlović was fired from Hayat, due to disagreements with the sports redaction of Hayat.

His style of commentating is unique to the area of former Yugoslavia, and it is similar to Brazilian and Turkish commentators. Mijajlović claims that this is because "...when I was little, my brother and I used to watch Galatasaray in the Turkish League, whose commentators inspired me."

Personal life
Mijajlović moved to Belgrade in 1992, but moved back to Sarajevo in 2009. He converted to Islam and changed his name to Mustafa in 2016.

Return to TV
Mijajlović today works at Face TV.

References

1972 births
Living people
People from Tuzla
Serbs of Bosnia and Herzegovina
Former Serbian Orthodox Christians
Converts to Islam from Eastern Orthodoxy
Bosnia and Herzegovina Muslims
Sports commentators
Bosnia and Herzegovina sportspeople
Bosnia and Herzegovina journalists